Li Yueying is the name of:

 Hazel Ying Lee (1912–1944), Chinese-American pilot
 Hsiao Li Lindsay, Baroness Lindsay of Birker (1916–2010), born Li Yueying, British peeress